The Hungarian Reformed Church (HRC) or Hungarian Reformed Communion is a global fellowship of continental Reformed denominations historically related to the Reformed Church of Hungary.

The purpose of the organization is to maintain unity among Hungarian Reformed churches in different countries and to give joint representation of denominations in international organizations of Reformed denominations.

History 

From the Dissolution of Austria-Hungary, after the First World War, the members of the Reformed Church of Hungary were spread over several countries. In each of these, Hungarian retirees organized themselves as a new national denomination.

On May 22, 2009, 6 of the Hungarian Reformed denominations decided to form a Hungarian Reformed Fellowship, also called the Hungarian Reformed Church.

Doctrine 

All denominations part of the communion subscribe to the Second Helvetic Confession and Heidelberg Catechism as a faithful expression of biblical doctrines, such as the Reformed Church of Hungary.

Likewise, they differ from the other reformed denominations in that they call those responsible for a church jurisdiction "bishop".

Members 

Communion members are:
 Reformed Church of Hungary
 Reformed Church of Romania
 Reformed Church in Transcarpathia
 Reformed Christian Church in Serbia
 Reformed Christian Church in Croatia
 Reformed Christian Church in Slovakia
 Reformed Christian Church in Slovenia

References 

International bodies of Reformed denominations